Class 253, Class 254 and Class 255 are TOPS classifications that have been applied to InterCity 125 high speed trains in Great Britain in the past. The classifications are not currently in official use, but the Class 255 designation was resurrected by Great Western Railway for their short-formed 2+4 "Castle class" sets in 2019.

History

Class 253 and 254

When built, from 1976 onwards, the InterCity 125 rolling stock was classified in the diesel-electric multiple unit (DEMU) series; with semi-fixed formations of power cars and intermediate passenger-carrying trailer cars. They were all numbered in the 4xxxx carriage series. Numbers followed on from those allocated to the prototype Class 252; power cars being numbered from 43002 upwards. Class 253 were Western Region 2+7 (two power cars and seven coaches) sets operating out of London Paddington, Class 254 Eastern Region and Scottish Region 2+8 sets operating out of London King's Cross.

Because power cars could be serviced independently of their allocated set number, the initial set numbering was abolished on the power cars once they started to be moved between sets – the power cars were then reclassified class 43 locomotives once divorced from the initial fixed formations and the trailers treated as coaching stock (albeit remaining dedicated to InterCity 125 formations. None of this resulted in power car or carriage renumbering.

Classes 253 and 254 are still referenced in the Network Rail Scottish sectional appendix.

Class 255

In 2002, Class 255 was allocated for the reformation of some HST power cars and trailers into semi-fixed formation trains, to be known as Virgin Challengers, for use by Virgin CrossCountry after the introduction of its new Voyagers (classes 220 and 221). These formations would have had power cars sandwiching one Trailer First, a Trailer Buffet, two Trailer Seconds and a Trailer Guard Second, and were intended for use on planned services between Blackpool, Manchester and Birmingham, and Paddington to Birmingham via Swindon. These plans were later abandoned with the Strategic Rail Authority deciding to transfer most of the stock to Midland Mainline for London St Pancras to Manchester Project Rio services.

Present 
Great Western Railway's short formed HST sets have been designated the Class 255 Castle classification, though this is not a TOPS classification as they are still InterCity 125 trains. Following their use on intercity services with GWR until the Class 800 and Class 802 units took over, GWR announced they would be retaining eleven four-carriage sets for increasing capacity on local and regional services between Cardiff Central, Bristol Temple Meads, Taunton, Plymouth and Penzance, with one set spare. With twelve sets total, 48 Mark 3 coaches with sliding doors and 24 Class 43 powercars will be kept to form these sets, with the new addition of toilet retention tanks and a passenger information system. The first set for GWR entered service in March 2018.

In December 2022, GWR announced the phased withdrawal of Castle sets by December 2023, due to a drop in passenger numbers in the wake of the COVID-19 pandemic, GWR has spare IET sets. Further, the high cost of operating and maintaining the 50+ year old Castle sets, and the cost-reduction proposal to bring the maintenance of the directly-contracted 802 IET's in-house at GWR's Laira TMD, meant that a phased withdrawal was proposed. GWR will reduce to seven diagrams in May 2023, three in September 2023, before the sets are retired in December 2023.

Named powercars 
With the sets being known as Castle sets, GWR announced that most powercars in the fleet would be receiving a nameplate based on a traditional castle from the south-west. From July 2022 more names were attached and some powercars with non-castle plates  lost them.

Formation

The vehicle types used to form High Speed Trains are listed below:

The 197 power cars produced are numbered 43002-43198. The two prototype power cars, were originally numbered 41001 and 41002, latterly becoming 43000 and 43001.

Accidents and incidents

References

Further reading

External links

253
253
Diesel electric multiple units
Train-related introductions in 1976